The Carnegie Mellon School of Music  in Pittsburgh, Pennsylvania is a degree-granting institution founded in 1912 as one of five divisions of Carnegie Mellon University's College of Fine Arts.

A National Association of Schools of Music accredited school, it offers undergraduate and graduate study, as well as Pre-College Program in the summer. Students receive the highest level of individualized instruction from professional musicians and master teachers. Described as ‘the destination for the academically gifted musician,’ Carnegie Mellon School of Music offers majors in every orchestral instrument, piano, organ, guitar, bagpipes, voice and composition. In fall 2009, the school began offering a Bachelor of Science and Master of Science in Music and Technology, a tri-college curriculum that includes courses in the School of Computer Science and Carnegie Institute of Technology.

Instrumentalists are trained to perform various styles and periods of music through a range of performing ensembles. These include the Carnegie Mellon Philharmonic Orchestra, Wind Ensemble, Jazz Ensemble, Percussion Ensemble, Flute Ensemble, Contemporary Ensemble, and the interdisciplinary Exploded Ensemble, hosted within the School of Music and Carnegie Mellon's IDeATe program

Vocalists specialize in opera. Private studio instruction is augmented by choir, opera workshop and diction/ repertoire classes. Voice majors also study acting, dance and three languages. The School of Music presents two fully staged opera/music theater productions each year.

Carnegie Mellon offers a strong emphasis on contemporary music and conducting. Composition students write works for all types of instrumental and vocal groupings. All the works are performed and professionally recorded, culminating in an orchestral piece to be written during the senior year.

External links
Carnegie Mellon University
College of Fine Arts
School of Music
School of Music News

Music
Music schools in Pennsylvania